Once You Meet a Stranger is a 1996 American thriller television film directed by Tommy Lee Wallace. It is a remake of Alfred Hitchcock's 1951 film Strangers on a Train, based on the 1950 novel by Patricia Highsmith. In the remake, the genders of the principal characters have been switched from male to female. It stars Jacqueline Bisset and Theresa Russell, and premiered on CBS on September 25, 1996.

Plot
A fading actress, Sheila, finds consolation in a stranger, Margo, during her train journey. Sheila tells Margo of her desire to divorce her husband, and in turn Margo shares her hatred for her domineering mother. They jokingly  suggest performing a murder on each other's behalf. But all too soon the joke becomes reality.

Cast
 Jacqueline Bisset as Sheila Gaines
 Theresa Russell as Margo Anthony
 Mimi Kennedy as Connie
 Celeste Holm as Clara
 Richard Doyle as Mr. Anthony
 Robert Desiderio as Andy Stahl
 Kathryne Dora Brown as Skeptic
 Nick Mancuso as Aaron

References

External links
 

1996 television films
1996 films
1996 thriller films
1990s American films
1990s English-language films
American thriller television films
CBS network films
Films about murder
Films based on adaptations
Films based on American thriller novels
Films based on works by Patricia Highsmith
Films directed by Tommy Lee Wallace
Films set on trains
Films with screenplays by Raymond Chandler
Remakes of American films
Television films based on books
Television remakes of films
Thriller film remakes